Clarence Jameson (June 12, 1872 – September 20, 1928) was a municipal official and political figure in Nova Scotia, Canada. He represented Digby in the House of Commons of Canada from 1908 to 1917 as a Conservative.

He was born in Bedeque, Prince Edward Island, the son of J. H. Jameson and Sophie Shrewe, and was educated at the Prince County Academy. Jameson studied law in Digby. He was town clerk and treasurer for Digby. In 1926, he married Anna MacDonald. Jameson was a Civil Service Commissioner in Ottawa from 1917 to 1926. He died in Digby at the age of 56.

References

Members of the House of Commons of Canada from Nova Scotia
Conservative Party of Canada (1867–1942) MPs
1872 births
1928 deaths